The Al-Kawther gas field is a natural gas field located in the Ad Dakhiliyah Governorate. It was discovered in 2000, and developed by BP. It began production in 2017 and will produce natural gas and condensates. The total proven reserves of the Al-Kawther gas field are around 22.4 trillion cubic feet (640×109m³), and production is slated to be around 706 million cubic feet/day (20×105m³).

References

Natural gas fields in Oman